Volt is a French language news magazine television series for teenagers. It airs on TFO, the French language public broadcaster in Ontario, as well as on Radio-Canada's video on demand website TOU.TV. The show debuted in 1994.  The television series ended in December 2010, after 16 years on air.

Hosts
Hosts for the 2007–2008 season of Volt were: 
Nadia Campbell
David Baeta
Fabienne L'Abbé
Christian Martel
Yamil Coulombe

External links 
 Volt
 

1990s Canadian television news shows
1994 Canadian television series debuts
TFO original programming
1990s Canadian children's television series
Television news program articles using incorrect naming style
2000s Canadian television news shows
2000s Canadian children's television series
2010s Canadian television news shows
2010s Canadian children's television series
2010 Canadian television series endings